The Rendiconti di Matematica e delle sue Applicazioni (Reports on Mathematics and its applications) is an open access peer-reviewed mathematics journal, jointly published by the "Guido Castelnuovo" Department of Mathematics of the Sapienza University of Rome and by the Istituto Nazionale di Alta Matematica Francesco Severi, established in 1913. The Journal started his publications a year after, in 1914, and his first director was Vito Volterra.

It publishes research articles in pure and applied mathematics, without imposing restrictions on the length of the work: for this reason, the submission of surveys, articles of foundational nature and doctoral dissertations is also encouraged. As in every peer reviewed journal, every article is refereed, and the journal adheres to the EMS Code of Practice.

The journal is abstracted and indexed by Mathematical Reviews,  Zentralblatt MATH and Scopus.

Historical notes

Foundation and the first four series
The journal was founded in 1913 as the press organ of the "Seminario Matematico della Facoltà di Scienze della Reale Uninversità di Roma": its first director (Editor in chief) was Vito Volterra, who held this position from its foundation to the year 1921. The direction passed to Guido Castelnuovo who held it from 1921 to 1922: with the beginning of and during the publishing of the whole second and third series of the journal, from 1922 to 1935 Federigo Enriques was the director. During fourth series of the journal, at the starting of which it underwent its first name change, the direction passed to Gaetano Scorza, who held it until his death in 1939.

The INdAM and its influence
The founding of the Istituto Nazionale di Alta Matematica in 1939, under the decisive influence of Francesco Severi, had important consequences on the "Rendiconti del Seminario Matematico". On 23 November 1939, during its first meeting, the Scientific Council of the then newborn institute, considering the need of a means to publish the results of the research done by the members and the students working at the institute, decided to merge the needed means and the already existing journal in one single entity, giving birth to the "Rendiconti di Matematica e delle sue Applicazioni". Entrusted with this double function the fifth series of the journal, from the first volume published in 1940 to the first issue of the fourth volume published in 1943, included a section listing the programs of the INdAM courses of the current academic year as well as section listing the research problems proposed by the lecturers currently working at the institute.

Timeline of Journal series and editors in chief

See also
Rendiconti del Seminario Matematico della Università di Padova
Rendiconti del Seminario Matematico Università e Politecnico di Torino
Rivista di Matematica della Università di Parma

Notes

References

.
.
.
.
.
. This is a monographic fascicle published on the "Bollettino della Unione Matematica Italiana", describing the history of the "Istituto Nazionale di Alta Matematica Francesco Severi" from its foundation in 1939 to 2003: it was written by Gino Roghi and includes a presentation by Salvatore Coen and a preface by Corrado De Concini. It is almost exclusively based on sources from the institute archives: the wealth and variety of materials included, jointly with its appendices and indexes, make this monograph a useful reference not only for the history of the institute itself, but also for the history of many mathematicians who taught or followed the institute courses or simply worked there.
. The "Introduction" (English translation of the title) to the indexes volume of the first five series of the journal.
. This work describes the research activity at the Sapienza University of Rome and at the (at that time newly created) "Istituto Nazionale di Alta Matematica Francesco Severi"  from the end of the 1930s to the early 1940s.

External links
Volumes from 14 (1994) to 22 (2002) of the Series VIII of the "Rendiconti" archived at the Internet Archive.

Mathematics journals
Publications established in 1913
Biannual journals
Academic journals associated with universities and colleges
Open access journals